Following is a list of all Article III United States federal judges appointed by President Bill Clinton during his presidency. In total Clinton appointed 378 Article III federal judges, including two justices to the Supreme Court of the United States, 66 judges to the United States Courts of Appeals, 305 judges to the United States district courts and 5 judges to the United States Court of International Trade. Clinton's total of 378 judicial appointments is the second most in American history behind Ronald Reagan, and his 305 district court judges is a record.

Additionally, 8 Article I federal judge appointments are listed, including 1 judge to the United States Court of Appeals for Veterans Claims and 7 judges to the United States Tax Court. This is not a complete list of Clinton's Article I federal judge appointments.

United States Supreme Court justices

Speculation abounded over potential Clinton nominations to the Supreme Court even before his presidency officially began, given the advanced ages of several justices. On March 19, 1993, Justice Byron White announced his retirement effective at the end of the Supreme Court's 1992–1993 term.

President Clinton announced Ruth Bader Ginsburg as White's replacement on June 15, 1993, and she was confirmed by the United States Senate on August 3, 1993.

On April 6, 1994, Associate Justice Harry Blackmun announced his retirement, which ultimately took effect August 3, 1994.  President Clinton announced Stephen Breyer as Blackmun's replacement on May 13, 1994, with the United States Senate confirming Breyer on July 29, 1994.

Courts of appeals

District courts

United States Court of International Trade

Specialty courts (Article I)

United States Court of Appeals for the Armed Forces

United States Court of Federal Claims

United States Court of Veterans Appeals

United States Tax Court

Territorial courts (Article IV)

Notes

Courts

Renominations

Recess appointments

References
General

 
 

Specific

Sources
 Federal Judicial Center

Clinton

Presidency of Bill Clinton
Bill Clinton-related lists